The 2006 Western Kentucky Hilltoppers football team represented Western Kentucky University in the 2006 NCAA Division I FCS football season and were led by head coach David Elson. It was the school's last season as a member of Gateway Football Conference before their transition to the FBS. The Hilltoppers' schedule was rigorous, with seven ranked opponents, including Georgia. 

This team’s roster included future National Football League (NFL) players Curtis Hamilton, Dan Cline, and Greg Ryan. Hamilton was named to the Hanson All American team. The All-Conference team included Hamilton, Marion Rumph, Dusty Bear, Blake Boyd, Andre Lewis, and Chris Sullivan.

Schedule

References

Western Kentucky
Western Kentucky Hilltoppers football seasons
Western Kentucky Hilltoppers football